CCT2 may refer to:
CCT2 (gene)
 Cookstown Airport, Ontario, Canada: Transport Canada location identifier CCT2